The 1996 SMU Mustangs football team represented Southern Methodist University (SMU) as a member of the Mountain Division of the Western Athletic Conference (WAC) during the 1996 NCAA Division I-A football season. Led by Tom Rossley in his sixth and final season as head coach, the Mustangs compiled an overall record of 5–6 with a mark of 4–4 in conference play, placing fourth in the WAC's Mountain Division. This was SMU's first season as a member of the WAC after playing in the Southwest Conference (SWC) since 1918.

Schedule

Roster

References

SMU
SMU Mustangs football seasons
SMU Mustangs football